Oregon is an American jazz and world music group, formed in 1970 by Ralph Towner, Paul McCandless, Glen Moore, and Collin Walcott.

History
Towner and Moore had been friends and occasional collaborators since meeting in 1960 as students at the University of Oregon. By 1969, both were working musicians living in New York; while collaborating with folksinger Tim Hardin they were introduced to world music pioneer Paul Winter's "Consort" ensemble, particularly member Collin Walcott, with whom Towner began improvising as an informal duo. By 1970 Towner and Moore had joined the Winter Consort and met fellow member McCandless; the four began exploring improvisation on their own, while their contributions continued to be seminal in redefining the Winter Consort "sound" in compositions like Towner's "Icarus".

The four musicians made their first group recording in 1970, but the label, Increase Records, went out of business before it could be released (it eventually was issued by Vanguard in 1980 as Our First Record). Oregon made its "formal" debut in New York City in 1971 (originally named "Thyme — Music of Another Present Era", the name change to Oregon was suggested by McCandless).

The group's first release Music of Another Present Era was issued on Vanguard in 1972 (the four also recorded for ECM, though the recording, 1973's Trios Solos, was billed as "Ralph Towner with Glen Moore"). With those initial recordings and the follow-ups Distant Hills (1973) and Winter Light (1974) (all on Vanguard), Oregon established itself as one of the leading improvisational groups of its day, blending Indian and Western classical music with jazz, folk, space music and avant-garde elements. The group released numerous albums on Vanguard throughout the 1970s, also making three records for Elektra/Asylum between 1978 and 1980 (including the highly acclaimed Out of the Woods and a live recording taken from performances at Carnegie Hall and in Canada in late 1979).  
 
After a couple years' hiatus devoted to individual projects (including the birth of Walcott's daughter in 1980), the group reassembled, recording for ECM, releasing the eponymous Oregon in 1983 and Crossing in 1984.  Before the latter's release, however, during a 1984 tour Walcott was killed in an automobile accident in the former East Germany. Oregon temporarily disbanded, but regrouped in May 1985 at a memorial concert for Walcott in New York City, with Indian percussionist Trilok Gurtu sitting in (Walcott's own choice for his replacement should it become necessary). In 1986, Gurtu was invited to join Oregon; the band resumed touring and released three albums, Ecotopia, 45th Parallel and Always, Never and Forever, during his five years as a member.

After Trilok Gurtu's departure, the group continued as a trio, issuing two albums during that period. The 1997 album Northwest Passage marked a return to the inclusion of percussion, featuring either drummer Mark Walker or Turkish Armenian percussionist Arto Tunçboyacıyan on most tracks; subsequently, Walker was taken on as a full member. In 1999, the ensemble traveled to Moscow, Russia, to record with the Tchaikovsky Symphony Orchestra of Moscow Radio, premiering orchestral compositions that had been in development for years, some dating back to their first days with the Winter Consort; that project's 2000 release, Oregon in Moscow, garnered four Grammy Award nominations. 2002 saw the release of Live at Yoshi's, recorded in San Francisco, the first live Oregon recording in two decades.

In March 2015, it was announced that Glen Moore was departing from the group, with bassist Paolino Dalla Porta replacing him.

As of 2019, Oregon has no further plans to exist as a touring ensemble.

Discography
on Vanguard
 1970 - Our First Record (first released 1980)
 1972 - Music of Another Present Era 
 1973 - Distant Hills 
 1974 - Winter Light 
 1975 - In Concert 
 1976 - Together - with drummer Elvin Jones
 1977 - Friends 
 1978 - Violin - with violinist Zbigniew Seifert
 1979 - Moon and Mind
 1981 - OREGON - The Essential LP Duplo 1981 Full Album

on Elektra
 1978 - Out of the Woods 
 1979 - Roots in the Sky 
 1980 - In Performance

on ECM
 1983 - Oregon 
 1984 - Crossing 
 1987 - Ecotopia

on CBS /Portrait
 1989 - 45th Parallel

on Intuition
 1991 - Always, Never and Forever 
 1993 - Troika

on Chesky
 1995 - Beyond Words

on Intuition
 1997 - Northwest Passage 
 1998 - Music for a Midsummer Night's Dream (The Oregon Trio) 
 2000 - In Moscow - with the Moscow Tchaikovsky Symphony Orchestra
 2002 - Live at Yoshi's

on CamJazz
 2005 - Prime 
 2005 - The Glide (1 track, new version on iTunes)
 2007 - 1000 Kilometers 
 2010 - In Stride 
 2012 - Family Tree
 2017 - Lantern

References

External links 
Official Oregon website
Oregon discography
Oregon setlists and recordings
Interview with Oregon on NPR (2001)
Mark Walker official site

Chamber jazz ensembles
Folk jazz musicians
Jazz fusion ensembles
Chesky Records artists
ECM Records artists
Vanguard Records artists
Elektra Records artists
Portrait Records artists
CAM Jazz artists
American world music groups
Musical groups established in 1970
Musicians from Eugene, Oregon
Musical groups from Oregon
1970 establishments in Oregon
Oregon (band) members